Neyab (also Romanized as Neyāb) is a village in Safiabad Rural District, Bam and Safiabad District, Esfarayen County, North Khorasan Province, Iran. At the 2006 census, its population was 121, in 24 families.

See also

References 

Populated places in Esfarayen County